Paul Newton is an electronic dance music DJ and producer from Liverpool. He was a member of Neve, who had a #70 hit with a remix of Y-Traxx's Mystery Land and a member of Point4, who wrote the Lisa Scott-Lee songs Lately and Too Far Gone which made #6 and #11 on the UK Singles Chart.

References

Year of birth missing (living people)
Living people
DJs from Liverpool